Adayalam is a 1991 Indian Malayalam comedy-mystery film directed by K. Madhu and written by S. N. Swamy, starring Mammootty, Rekha, Shobana, Murali, and Manianpilla Raju. The film was produced by actor Janardanan, who also played a supporting role.

Plot
Latha, daughter of  Menon, a rich businessman gets a threatening call from Raji demanding Rs 5 lakhs not to reveal a deadly secret about her father. Frightened Latha approaches her family advocate Haridas for a solution. Haridas refers Latha to Captain Hariharan, who now runs a security service. Though initially he is reluctant to take up the investigation on Raji, Haiharan decides to go ahead with it. In the meanwhile Raji is found dead. Inspector Raju Peter suspects Hariharan who informs Latha about the death. Malini, sister of Latha, inquires with Hariharan about Raji, Latha and the reason for the probe, but Hariharan says it's something personal. Meanwhile, Suresh, their cousin, is found dead too. Hariharan's probe to find the truth is the rest of the story.

Cast
 Mammootty as Captain Hariharan
 Rekha as Latha
 Shobana as Malini
 Murali as Dr. Mohan
 Lalu Alex as CI Raju Peter
 Maniyanpilla Raju as Pappan
 Vijayaraghavan as Suresh
 Janardhanan as Advocate Haridas
 Innocent as DYSP S. Viswhappan
 Sankaradi as Panicker
 K. P. Ummer as Shankara Menon
 Kalpana as Rosemary
 Kunchan as Kannan, Peter's Assistant
 T. P. Madhavan as M.K. Keshavan
 Valsala Menon as Sarojini
 Bheeman Raghu as Raju
 Ragini as Raji

Box office
The film received positive response from the critics and was commercial success.

In his memoir, "Innaleyude Innu", Janardhanan says that he sold the movie outright to producer Good Knight Mohan. He also said that the movie was not as much a financial success as they expected

References

External links
 

1990s Malayalam-language films
1990s comedy mystery films
1991 films
Indian comedy mystery films
Films directed by K. Madhu
1991 comedy films